Lanco may refer to:
 Lanco, Chile, a city and commune
 Lanco (band), an American country music band 
 Lanco, the stage name of Alberto Gallego, a Spanish musician and football manager
 Lanco Infratech, an Indian business conglomerate
 LATAM Cargo Colombia, a Colombian cargo airline formerly known as LANCO
 Langendorf Watch Company SA, a Swiss watchmaker with the brand Lanco